Stenolechia squamifera is a moth of the family Gelechiidae. It is found in Japan (Kyushu, Tsushima Island).

The length of the forewings is 3,5-4.2 mm. The forewings are whitish ochreous, speckled with fuscous, and with dark fuscous markings, consisting of three large blackish spots on the costa, two large blackish spots beneath the base of the fold and above the distal end of the fold, two small blackish spots on the fold, and three small blackish spots on the discal area. There are also four obscure fulvous spots in the basal two-thirds on the discal area.

References

Moths described in 1984
Stenolechia